Poogy Tales is the debut album by Israeli rock band, Kaveret, released in 1973. It is considered one of the most important albums in the history of Israeli music.

It is also amongst the best selling albums in Israel, with over 140 thousand copies sold.

Background
Poogy Tales is the debut album of Kaveret. The album is based on the rock opera by the same name that Danny Sanderson recorded in 1972, together with his bandmates from The Nahal Band (Gidi Gov, Alon Oleartchik, Efrahim Shamir, Miri Aloni, David Shanen and Tami Azaria). Gov, Oleartchik and Shamir went on to become members of Kaveret. Abraham (Deshe) "Fashanel" who signed the band and produced the album, suggested recording the opera as individual songs.

Songs
Most of the album's songs were written by Sanderson, with some help from other band members with lyrics and music. Most of the songs were characterized by nonsense, wordplay and surrealistic stories. The music was influenced by 1960s bands, especially The Beatles.

The title track, "Shir HaMakolet" (The Grocery Song), the skit "Anshei HaAron" (People of the Closet) and the song "Lo Yad'anu Ma La'asot" (We Didn't Know What to Do), were taken from the rock opera. The song "HaMagafahim Shel Barukh" (Barukh's Boots) was taken from another rock opera named "HaYeled MiBrazil" (The Child from Brazil). "Yosi, Ma Nishma" (What's up, Yosi?) is an instrumental track composed by Sanderson in order to teach Yehuda Adar how to play the guitar. The song "BaYom U'VaLaila" (At Day and Night) was written by Sanderson as "The Cold Shoulder" at the age of 15 with his friend, Melisa Konel and originally performed by the duo with their band "The Catacombs". The song "Yeled Mizdaqen" (A Boy Growing Old) was based on an Army Radio skit named "Poogy Mitkhashmel" (Poogy gets electrocuted). Alon Oleartchik claimed that the music was too beautiful to be wasted on a skit, so he wrote serious lyrics that stand apart from the rest of the album. The songs "Yo Ya" and "Po Qavur HaKelev" (Here Lies the Dog/Therein lies the rub) are based on the double meaning of Hebrew proverbs and make use of unexpected meanings of certain sayings.

The album's artwork was created by Itamar Neumann, a friend of Sanderson.

Reception
Poogy Tales was released in late 1973, after the Yom Kippur War. Before the war, the songs "Po Qavur HaKelev" and "Sherut Atzmi" (Self Service) did not get much radio play, and the band's humor did not always come across. Later, the album became a huge success both critically and commercially. The lighthearted and humorous tone of Poogy Tales appealed to the Israeli public after the trauma of the war, and the band's performances among reservists were also a great success. Kaveret concerts soon became a hit and approximately 70,000 albums were sold during the first year after its release. By the end of the 1980s, Poogy's Tales had sold more than 140,000 albums, making it one of the best-selling albums in the history of Israeli music.

The songs "HaMagafaim Shel Barukh" (chosen as song of the year by Army Radio and Kol Yisrael), "Shir HaMakolet" (No. 3 on the Army Radio hits chart), "Yeled Mizdaqen", "Po Qavur HaKelev" and "Yo Ya" were all successful on the radio. The band was chosen as "band of the Year" by Kol Yisrael.

After the album
A year after the release of Poogy Tales, Kaveret released their second studio album, Poogy in a Pita, which was also a great success.

in 1989, Poogy Tales was re-released by the label "Hed Artzi" including new 5 bonus tracks that weren't included in the original release. The bonus tracks are a cover of the classic "Haiu Leilot" ('There Were Some Nights') in a rehearsal, and the humorous skits "Matemat'iqa" ('Mathematics') and "Shi'ur Psanter" ('Piano Lesson') that were recorded by Sanderson, Gov and Meir Fenigstein.

"Yo ya" was covered by the Australian punk band Yidcore in 2005 for that band's second album Eighth Day Slice.

In 2013, for the 40th anniversary for the album, the band reunited for the fourth time since its break up in 1976. In honor of the reunion, Israeli musicians and bands such as Mercedes Band, Kerach 9 and others performed cover versions of songs from the album as part of a special Army Radio project.

Track listing
All songs were written and composed by Danny Sanderson except where noted.
Sipurei Pugy - Poogy Tales (סיפורי פוגי) - 0:50
Shir HaMakolet - The Grocery Song (שיר המכולת) - 3:45
BaYom U'VaLaila - At Day and Night (ביום ובלילה) - 3:11 (music: Sanderson, Melisa Konel)
Sherut Atzmi - Self Service (שירות עצמי) - 2:45
Yeled Mizdaqen - A Boy Growing Old (ילד מזדקן) - 3:11 (lyrics: Alon Oleartchik)
Lamrot Hakol - In Spite of All (למרות הכל) - 7:03
Po Qavur HaKelev - Here lies the Dog (פה קבור הכלב) - 2:45
Sipur HaAron - The Story of the Closet (סיפור הארון) - 2:00
Lo Yad'anu Ma La'asot - We Didn't Know What to Do (לא ידענו מה לעשות) - 2:11)
Yosi, Ma Nishma - Yosi, What's Up (יוסי, מה נשמע) - 2:55
HaMagafaim Shel Barukh - Barukh's Boots (המגפיים של ברוך) - 4:17 (lyrics: Oleartchik, Sandreson, Menahem Zilberman)
Nekhmad - Nice (נחמד) - 4:44
Yo Ya (יו יה) - 3:58
Bonus tracks at the CD edition
"Pugy 71" (פוגי 71) - 0:05
"Matemat'iqa" - Mathematics (מתמטיקה) - 1:31
"Shi'ur Psanter" - Piano Lesson (שיעור פסנתר) - 4:11
"HaMagafaim Shel Efraim" - Efraim's Boots (המגפיים של אפרים) - 1:11
"Haiu Leilot" - There Were Some Nights (היו לילות) - 4:00 (lyrics: Ya'akov Orland music: Mordechai Zaira)

Personnel
Danny Sanderson - vocals, guitars, music, lyrics
Gidi Gov - lead vocals, tambourine
Efraim Shamir - lead vocals, guitars
Alon Oleartchik - vocals, bass guitar
Yitzhak "Churchill" Klepter - vocals, electric guitar
Yoni Rechter - vocals, piano, Fender Rhodes
Meir "Poogy" Fenigstein - drums, percussion, spoken word and vocals as "Poogy"

References 

1973 debut albums
Kaveret albums